Pie de la Cuesta is a small beach resort town in the Mexican state of Guerrero, approximately 5 miles north-west of Acapulco, and it is the location of a military base of the Mexican Air Force.

History 
Cave paintings from 1.200 BC and petroglyphs have been discovered. They indicate the early presence of fishing settlements, with agriculture and hunting as secondary activities.

Nobel Prize–winning author Gabriel Garcia Marquez has stated in interviews that the initial inspiration for writing his famous novel One Hundred Years of Solitude took place in the mid-1960s while driving the 10 kilometers from Acapulco to Pie de la Cuesta.

In the 1970s, when José López Portillo was President, the Judicial Police of Guerrero assassinated at least 143 alleged Guerrilleras and Guerrilleros from the Party of the Poor, on the military base. Their bodies were dumped in the Pacific by an IAI Arava of the Escuadrón Aéreo 301 tail-number 2005.

It is a long stretch of land bordered by rough seas on one side and a very calm lagoon on the other. Waterskiing can be done in the lagoon, as can trips to see the "island" (Isla Montosa) on the lagoon where one can find crocodiles in which Don Pio, the man that lived there caught. The beach's somewhat rougher waves and remote location from the tourist center of Acapulco account for its lack of popularity among tourists, but the "closer-to-nature" atmosphere, romantic sunsets, much better prices, and many of the good small mom and pop resorts there make up for the number of tourists it gets.

References 

Populated places in Guerrero